Probathyopsis is an extinct genus of Uintatheriidae. It was similar to Prodinoceras. Probathyopsis lived in the United States in the Paleocene epoch. Its name means "before Bathyopsis".

Males of Probathyopsis reached  in body mass.

References

Dinoceratans
Paleocene mammals of North America
Prehistoric placental genera